Schalk David Booysen (22 August 1927 – 1 May 2011) was a South African sprinter. He competed in the men's 200 metres at the 1952 Summer Olympics. He finished seventh in the 1950 British Empire Games 880 yards. In the 1950 British Empire Games 440 yards he was eliminated in the heats.

References

1927 births
2011 deaths
Athletes (track and field) at the 1952 Summer Olympics
South African male sprinters
Olympic athletes of South Africa
Athletes (track and field) at the 1950 British Empire Games
Commonwealth Games competitors for South Africa
Sportspeople from Pretoria
Afrikaner people